Sri Lanka is a tropical island situated close to the southern tip of India. The invertebrate fauna is as large as it is common to other regions of the world. So it is complicated to summarize the exact number of species found within the country.

Echinoderms belong to the phylum Echinodermata. They are deuterostomes that are closely related to chordates. Echinoderms are characterized by having a water vascular system, tube feet, radial symmetry, and undergo complete regeneration from a single limb. It is the largest phylum that has no freshwater or terrestrial members. There are five classes of echinoderms: Asteroidea (starfish), Ophiuroidea (brittle star), Echinoidea (sea urchin), Crinoidea (sea lily) and Holothuroidea (sea cucumber).

The following list provides echinoderms currently identified in Sri Lankan waters.

Sea Urchins
The first detailed work on irregular echinoids was carried out by Agassiz in 1872 and then by Clark & Rowe in 1971 where they compiled records of 24 species of irregular sea urchins in the "Ceylon area". However, some of these localities now belong to the Indian Territory. In 2017, a recent species list has been made by Arachchige et al., where he described 27 irregular echinoids from Sri Lankan waters. The information on regular echinoids was listed by Agassiz & Desor in 1846 which continued to advance until the end of the 19th century. Then, there was a knowledge gap between the mid-20th and the beginning of the 21st centuries mainly due to a lack of systematic studies. However, in the latter part, two checklists have been published by the IUCN Red List in 2006 and 2012.

Currently, in Sri Lanka, there are 39 regular echinoids belong to 28 genera, nine families, and five orders are recorded. Meanwhile, there are 21 irregular echinoid species belong to four orders, nine families, and 15 genera in Sri Lanka.

Irregular echinoids

Order: Echinoneoida

Family: Echinoneidae 
Echinoneus cyclostomus
Koehleraster abnormalis

Order: Echinolampadoida

Family: Echinolampadidae - Cassiduloids 
Echinolampas alexandri
Echinolampas ovata

Order: Clypeasteroida - Sand dollars

Family: Astriclypeidae 
Echinodiscus bisperforatus
Echinodiscus truncatus
Sculpsitechinus auritus

Family: Clypeasteridae 
Clypeaster humilis
Clypeaster reticulatus

Family: Fibulariidae 
Echinocyamus megapetalus
Fibulariella angulipora
Fibularia

Family: Laganidae 
Jacksonaster depressum
Peronella lesueuri
Peronella oblonga

Order: Spatangoida - Heart urchins

Family: Brissidae 
Brissus agassizii
Metalia sternalis

Family: Loveniidae 
Lovenia elongate

Family: Maretiidae 
Nacospatangus alta

Regular echinoids

Order: Cidaroida

Family: Cidaridae 
Phyllacanthus imperialis

Order: Diadematoida

Family: Diadematidae 
Astropyga radiata
Diadema savignyi
Diadema setosum
Echinothrix calamaris
Echinothrix diadema

Order: Stomopneustoida

Family: Stomopneustidae 
Stomopneustes variolaris

Order: Camarodonta

Family: Echinometridae 
Echinometra ex
Echinostrephus molaris
Heterocentrotus mamillatus

Family: Temnopleuridae 
Microcyphus ceylanicus
Salmacis bicolor
Salmacis virgulata
Temnopleurus toreumaticus

Family: Toxopneustidae 
Pseudoboletia maculata
Toxopneustes pileolus
Tripneustes gratilla

Starfish
The exact number of starfish in Sri Lankan waters is unknown. Many works came through the work done based on Indian echinoderms in and around Indian seas.

Order: Valvatida

Family: Acanthasteridae 
Acanthaster planci

Family: Asterinidae 
Asterina coronata

Family: Ophidiasteridae 
Gomophia egyptiaca
Heteronardoa carinata
Linckia multifora

Family: Oreasteridae 
Anthenea pentagonula
Anthenea regalis
Goniodiscaster scaber
Siraster tuberculatus
Stellaster equestris
Stellaster incei

Family: Goniasteridae 
Fromia indica

Order: Forcipulatida

Family: Asteriidae 
Astrostole scabra

Order: Paxillosida

Family: Astropectinidae 
Astropecten vappa

Family: Luidiidae 
Luidia sagamina
Luidia savignyi

Brittle stars
There is little works have done to identify the brittle star species around Sri Lanka. But, further detailed work is necessary to compile a checklist.

Order: Ophiurida

Family: Ophiactidae 
Ophiactis savignyi

Family: Ophiocomidae 
Ophiocoma anaglyptica

Family: Ophiodermatidae 
Ophiarachnella gorgonia
Ophiodyscrita instrata

Family: Ophiolepididae 
Ophiolepis cincta

Family: Ophiomyxidae 
Ophiarachna incrassata

Family: Ophiotrichidae 
Gymnolophus obscura

Sea cucumber
The diversity of sea cucumbers of Sri Lanka show extensive research work. Many species are edible and economically important, whereas some researches about sea cucumbers in the coastal waters of Sri Lanka have been documented. However, some species are extensively studied. The sea cucumber fishery was introduced to Sri Lanka by the Chinese particularly through the commodities taken to China for centuries. Since 1980, sea cucumber fishery rapidly grown throughout north, east and northwestern Sri Lankan coast. In 2010, D.C.T. Dissanayake and Gunnar Stefansson compiled a research on the abundance and distribution of commercial sea cucumber species in the coastal waters of Sri Lanka. They described twenty-five sea cucumber species belonging to seven genera from east and northwest coasts of Sri Lanka. Another research was carried out from May 2014 to June 2015 in Viyaparimuli and Munnai to identify the species composition and diversity of sea cucumber population in the Point Pedro coastal area of Jaffna peninsula. In 2008, Dissanayaka and Athukorala recorded 24 sea cucumber species from Northwestern and Eastern parts of Sri Lanka, and then in 2014, Kuganathan has reported sixteen species of sea cucumbers in the Jaffna estuary. In 2017, the status of holothurian fisheries in Mullaitivu coastal waters in the North-East region of Sri Lanka was documented. In 2020, a new sea cucumber record was identified from nearby waters. Apart from that, leading scientist D.C.T. Dissanayake has done extensive work on sea cucumbers.

Order: Apodida

Family: Synaptidae 
Synaptula lamperti

Order: Holothuriida

Family: Holothuriidae 
Actinopyga echinites
Actinopyga mauritiana
Actinopyga miliaris 
Bohadschia argus
Bohadschia atra
Bohadschia maculisparsa 
Bohadschia marmorata 
Bohadschia vitiensis
Holothuria atra
Holothuria edulis 
Holothuria fuscocinerea 
Holothuria fuscogilva
Holothuria hilla
Holothuria isuga
Holothuria leucospilota 
Holothuria nobilis
Holothuria scabra
Holoturia spinifera
Holothuria sp., type "pentard" 
Pearsonothuria graeffei

Order: Molpadiida

Family: Caudinidae 
Acaudina molpadioides

Order: Synallactida

Family: Stichopodidae 
Stichopus variegatus
Stichopus chloronotus
Stichopus herrmanni 
Stichopus horrens
Thelenota ananas 
Thelenota anax

Sea lilies
Researches on sea lily or feather star diversity of Sri Lankan waters have been very limited when compared with other echinoderm classes.

Order: Comatulida

Family: Colobometridae 
Cenometra bella
Colobometra arabica
Decametra informis

Family: Comatulidae 
Comaster nobilis
Comaster schlegelii

Family: Himerometridae 
Amphimetra molleri
Himerometra robustipinna

Family: Mariametridae 
Lamprometra palmata
Oxymetra finschii
Stephanometra indica
Stephanometra tenuipinna

Family: Tropiometridae 
Comatula pectinata
Tropiometra carinata

Family: Zygometridae 
Zygometra andromeda

References

Sri Lanka
Sri Lanka
echinoderms